Hud (also Romanized as Hūd and Hood) is a village in Bid Shahr Rural District, Bidshahr District, Evaz County, Fars Province, Iran. At the 2006 census, its population was 1,248, in 252 families.

References 

Populated places in Evaz County